Napoleonaea is a genus of woody plant in the family Lecythidaceae first described as a genus in 1804, the same year its namesake (Napoleon Bonaparte) crowned himself Emperor of the French. The genus is native to Africa.

Accepted species

References

 
Flora of Africa
Ericales genera
Taxa named by Palisot de Beauvois
Taxonomy articles created by Polbot